Tengnoupal district (Meitei pronunciation:/teŋ-nə́u-pəl/) is a district in Manipur, India. It was created in December 2016 by splitting the Chandel district.

The district headquarters has been relocated to Tengnoupal –. In the 1960s and 1970s, Tengnoupal was the District Headquarters, and it was shifted to Chandel in 1974. Tengnoupal district is geographically strategical for installation of many Government infrastructures.

Sub-divisions
The sub-divisions in Tengnoupal district are:
 Tengnoupal
 Moreh
 Machi

Demographics

At the time of the 2011 census, Tengnoupal district had a population of 59,110. Scheduled Castes and Scheduled Tribes make up 0.78% and 83.81% of the population respectively.

History 

The name "Tengnoupal district" was first used for the Chandel district was: this Tengnoupal district was established in 1974. In 1983, the name of this district was changed to Chandel district, as the district headquarters were located at Chandel.

On 9 December 2016, the Okram Ibobi Singh-led Indian National Congress state government announced the creation of seven new districts including the present-day Tengnoupal district, which was split from the Chandel district. Singh inaugurated the Tengnoupal district on December 16, amid protests by the United Naga Council and attacks by rebels, while his supporters welcomed the decision. Singh refused to go back on the decision, stating that the creation of the new districts would lead to faster development and administrative convenience.

See also 
 List of populated places in Tengnoupal district

Notes

References

External links 
 Official district website

 
Districts of Manipur